John I of Luxembourg (died: 17 May 1364), was a Lord of Ligny, Beauvoir, Roussy and La Roche from the House of Luxembourg.  He was a son of Lord Waleran II and his wife, Guyotte of Lille. He was a 3rd generation descendant of Henry V, Count of Luxembourg.

Around 1330 he married Alix of Dampierre (d. 1346), the heiress of Guy of Dampierre-Richebourg. Their children were:
 Marie, married in 1347 to Count Henry of Vaudémont (d. 1365)
 John (d. 1360/61), Lord of Roussy, and priest
 Guy I (d. 22 August 1371), Count of Ligny and St. Pol
 John (d. 4 April 1373), Bishop of Strasbourg from 1365 to 1369 and Archbishop of Mainz from 1371 to 1373
 Johanna (d. 1392), married Count Guy V of Saint-Pol (d. 1360)

House of Luxembourg
Year of birth unknown
1364 deaths
14th-century German nobility
Lords of France